The 2017 Men's EuroHockey Junior Championship was the 18th edition of the men's EuroHockey Junior Championship, the biennial international men's under-21 field hockey championship of Europe organized by the European Hockey Federation. It was held alongside the women's tournament in Valencia, Spain between 28 August and 3 September 2017.

The defending champions, the Netherlands won the tournament for the 9th time by defeating Belgium 5–3 in a shoot-out after the final finished in a 2–2 draw. The third-place match between Germany and Spain was cancelled due to illness.

Qualified teams
The following eight teams qualified based on their final positions in the 2014 EuroHockey Junior Championships.

Results

Preliminary round

Pool A

Pool B

Fifth to eighth place classification
The points obtained in the preliminary round against the other team are taken over.

Pool C

First to fourth place classification

Semi-finals

Third and fourth place

Final

Statistics

Final standings

 Relegated to the EuroHockey Junior Championship II

Goalscorers

See also
 2017 Men's EuroHockey Nations Championship
 2017 Women's EuroHockey Junior Championship

References

EuroHockey Junior Championship
EuroHockey Junior Championship
International field hockey competitions hosted by Spain
EuroHockey Junior Championship
Sports competitions in Valencia
21st century in Valencia
EuroHockey Junior Championship
EuroHockey Junior Championship
EuroHockey Championship